The International Working People's Association (IWPA), sometimes known as the "Black International," was an international anarchist political organization established in 1881 at a convention held in London, England. In America the group is best remembered as the political organization uniting Albert Parsons, August Spies, and other anarchist leaders prosecuted in the wake of the 1886 Haymarket bombing in Chicago.

Organizational history

Origins

The slow pace of progress and limited results managed by the Socialist Labor Party of America (organized as the "Workingmen's Party" in 1876) during its first years proved frustrating and demoralizing for many Sections of the organization. Absent of significant electoral success, many Sections of the SLP began to debate the question of armed struggle and to organize paramilitary Lehr-und-Wehr Vereine (Education and Defense Societies). This movement was particularly strong in the tough industrial center of Chicago, populated by a large number of German-speaking immigrants cognizant of the European revolutionary movement and its German-based propaganda literature.

Anarchists and revolutionary socialists (who in the vernacular of the day called themselves "Social Revolutionists") were united by their disdain with electoral politics and piecemeal ameliorative reform. Such tepid changes such as currency reform, civil service reform, state ownership of public works, and reduction of the tariff were dismissed as inconsequential. Only through the application of armed force would revolutionary transformation of American society and economy be possible, some believed. Various independent revolutionary clubs were formed.

In 1872, the International Workingmen's Association (now known as the "First International") had split, after the anarchist leader Mikhail Bakunin had been expelled by the General Council (whom Karl Marx directed). During the years 1872-1877 the St. Imier International claimed to be the heir of the IWA.

In 1881, a congress of anarchist and social revolutionary clubs was held in London, England aiming to establish a new international organization. This new organization, the International Working People's Association (later known as the "Black International") was intended to provide rallying point around which various national groups could organize themselves.

The London gathering was attended by a New York social revolutionary group, which upon returning to America called for a gathering of American revolutionary groups in Chicago. The 1881 Chicago convention which followed adopted for itself the name Revolutionary Socialist Party and approved a platform urging the formation of trade unions on "communistic" principles and urging that support only be lent to unions of a "progressive" character. The platform also denounced use of the ballot as a vehicle for revolutionary social change, declaring instead that elections were "an invention of the bourgeoisie to fool the workers." Instead, it would be "armed organizations of workingmen who stand ready with the gun to resist encroachment upon their rights" which were pivotal, the platform declared.

In America

A key turning-point came in December 1882 with the arrival in America of Johann Most, a former parliamentary representative of the Social Democratic Party of Germany who had turned to anarchism. Most had just finished up a 16-month term of imprisonment for having glorified the assassination of Russian Tsar Alexander II and urged its emulation in his newspaper, Freiheit (Freedom). A popular orator and brilliant journalist in the German language, Most's arrival was celebrated by an enthusiastic crowd in the great hall of the Cooper Union Institute in New York City. A tour of the principal industrial cities of America by Most followed in early 1883, a successful venture which led to the formation of a number of new local anarchist "groups".

Further aiding the anarchist cause, Most brought with him to New York City his newspaper, Freiheit (Freedom), which uncompromisingly advocated struggle against state authority, widening the gap between the electorally oriented socialists of the Socialist Labor Party and the burgeoning movement of "Social Revolutionists".

The split between the SLP and the social revolutionists and anarchist was formalized in 1883, when the groups held separate conventions, in Baltimore, Maryland, and Pittsburgh, Pennsylvania, respectively. The October 1883 convention of the anarchists and revolutionary socialists held in Pittsburgh was attended by representatives of groups in 26 cities, including among them Johann Most, August Spies, and Albert R. Parsons.

It was the Pittsburgh conclave which formally launched the International Working People's Association in America. The convention adopted a manifesto known as the Pittsburgh Proclamation, declaring the organization for "destruction of the existing class rule by all means" and for the establishment of an economic system based upon "free contracts between the autonomous (independent) communes and associations, resting upon a federalistic basis." An "Information Bureau" in Chicago was established to coordinate the activity of the "loose-knit federation of autonomous groups" declaring allegiance to the organization.

Delegates to the Pittsburgh convention agreed in the efficacy of armed force, but differed as to its function. Eastern delegates surrounding Johann Most argued in favor of the "propaganda of the deed"—individualistic acts of terrorism which would win alienated workers to the anarchist cause through the power of example. Western-based delegates such as Spies and Parsons argued instead for a primary emphasis on work in trade unions as the vehicle for revolutionary change, dismissing the labor movement's obsessive concern with immediate demands but insisting that the direct action of unions would be key in establishing the embryonic production groups of the new society. This mixture of anarchism and syndicalism would be known as the "Chicago Idea".

Growth and decline

The IWPA grew steadily in America from the time of its launch in the fall of 1883, reaching a peak of about 5,000 members. The majority of these members were immigrants hailing from Europe, primarily Germany. The circulation of Most's newspaper, Freiheit, increased handsomely, while some important German-language newspapers transferred their loyalties from the SLP to the new organization.

Meanwhile, the Socialist Labor Party withered on the vine, with its membership plummeting to just 1,500 and its National Secretary, Philip Van Patten, leaving a mysterious suicide note and disappearing, only to reemerge later in another city as a government employee. At its December 1883 Baltimore convention, the SLP took the extraordinary, albeit short-lived, step of abolishing the role of National Secretary altogether and adopting a particularly radical program in hopes of cobbling together some sort of organizational unity with the so-called "Internationalists" of the IWPA. Ultimately, however, the SLP determined that the difference over the question of violence between itself and the IWPA made unification impossible and a polemic war against anarchism was launched.

In the aftermath of the 1886 Haymarket bombing and the repression launched against prominent leaders of the American anarchist movement such as English-language newspaper editor Albert Parsons and German-language newspaper editor August Spies, American sections of the IWPA began to disintegrate rapidly. At least a portion of the American anarchist movement, at least one historian believes, came over to the more moderate Socialist Labor Party in the aftermath of the Chicago debacle.

The anarchist movement dissipated severely following the execution of the Haymarket leaders in 1887. Although The Alarm continued to be published in Chicago for a time, sympathizers and advertisers were scared off by the harsh repression and public approbation meted out to the anarchist leaders. A few small anarchist groups survived, however, notably those surrounding Johann Most and Benjamin Tucker and their respective newspapers, Freiheit and Liberty, published in New York and Boston.

Later revivals

The International Working People's Association (the so-called "Black International") is not to be confused with the International Workingmen's Association (IWA) established by Burnette G. Haskell and others on July 15, 1881, which borrowed its name from the First International. While discussions were held regarding a merger of these two organizations, talks came to naught. Haskell's IWMA (known informally as the "Red International") disappeared at the end of the 1890s.

An effort was made to revive the International Working People's Association by a convention of anarchists held in Amsterdam in 1907, but the organization was essentially stillborn.

A final move to relaunch the IWPA, more successful than the 1907 effort, was made in December 1921 at another convention of international anarchists held in Berlin.

Publications

American newspapers associated with the IWPA
 The Alarm, Chicago, October 1884-December 1888?.
 Chicagoer Arbeiter-Zeitung (Chicago Workers' News), Chicago, June 1874 – 1924? (Anarchist: 1880-1886).
 The Labor Enquirer, Denver, Colorado, 1882-1888.
 Die Fackel (The Torch), Chicago, May 1879-October 1919 (Anarchist: 1880-1886).
 Freedom, Chicago, November 1890-May 1892.
 Freiheit (Freedom), London, Berlin, Exeter, New York, Chicago, Hoboken, and Buffalo, January 1879-August 1910.
 Liberty, Boston, August 1881-April 1908.
 Lucifer, the Light-Bearer, Valley Falls, Kansas, Topeka, and Chicago, 1883-June 1907.
 Truth: A Journal for the Poor, San Francisco, 1881-December 1884.
 Der Vorbote (The Harbinger), Chicago, February 1874-April 1924 (Anarchist: 1880-1886).

 Sources: Richard T. Ely, Recent American Socialism, pp. 31, 32, 36. Dirk Hoerder with Christiane Harzig (eds.), The Immigrant Labor Press in North America, 1840s-1970s: An Annotated Bibliography. Westport, CT: Greenwood Press, 1987; Volume 3, pp. 389-390, 407-408, 411-413.

Pamphlet literature
 "'To the Workingmen of America."' Chicago: International Working People's Association, 1883. 4-page leaflet.
 Victor Hugo! His Two Messages: One to the Rich, the Other to the Poor. Chicago?: International Working People's Association, n.d. [1880s].
 William J. Gorsuch, Revolt! An American to Americans... Allegheny, PA: [IWPA] Group No. 1, 1885.

See also

Key members
 Samuel Fielden
 Johann Most
 Albert Parsons
 Michael Schwab
 August Spies

Other anarchist internationals and international networks
 Anarchist St. Imier International (1872–1877)
 International Workers Association (1922–)
 International of Anarchist Federations (1968–)
 Black Bridge International (2001–2004)
 International Libertarian Solidarity (2001–2005)
 Anarkismo.net (2005–)
 International Union of Anarchists (2011–)

Footnotes

Further reading
 International Working People's Association, "The Pittsburgh Proclamation." Corvallis, OR: 1000 Flowers Publishing, 2006.
 Albert R. Parsons, Anarchism: Its Philosophy and Scientific Basis as Defined by Some of its Apostles. Chicago: Mrs. A.R. Parsons, 1887.
 Life of Albert R. Parsons, with Brief History of the Labor Movement in America. Chicago: Lucy E. Parsons, 1889.
 Frederic Trautmann, The Voice of Terror: A Biography of Johann Most. Westport, CT: Greenwood Press, 1980.

External links
 Alan Dawley, "The International Working People's Association, The Lucy Parsons Project. Retrieved August 13, 2013.

Anarchist organisations in the United Kingdom
Anarchist organizations in the United States
Organizations established in 1881
Defunct international anarchist organizations
Political internationals
1881 establishments in the United Kingdom
Organizations disestablished in the 1890s
1890s disestablishments in the United States
Organizations established in 1907
Organizations disestablished in 1907
Organizations established in 1921
1921 establishments in the United States